Osama Khalaila (born 6 April 1998) is an Israeli professional footballer who plays as a striker for Israeli Premier League club Maccabi Bnei Reineh, on loan from Maccabi Tel Aviv, and the Israel national team.

Club career

Bnei Sakhnin F.C
Khalaila made his debut in the Israeli Premier League on 6 May 2017, coming on as a 66th-minute substitute against Beitar Jerusalem.

Maccabi Tel Aviv F.C
On 22 July 2021, Khalaila signed a three-year deal with Maccabi Tel Aviv for a fee of €515,000. He made his debut for Maccabi Tel Aviv in the UEFA Europa Conference League on 22 July, coming on as a 72nd-minute substitute against FK Sutjeska Nikšić. He scored two goals in the return fixture on 29 July.

Loan to Maccabi Bnei Reineh  
Khalaila was sent on loan to Maccabi Bnei Reineh on 6 September 2022. He scored his first goal for Bnei Sakhnin on 3 November in a 3–2 victory over Beitar Jerusalem.

International career 
Khalaila made his debut for Israel national football team as a substitute in a friendly against Portugal on 9 June 2021.

Career statistics

International

References

External links 
 
 
 Khalaila at Footballdatabase

1998 births
Living people
Arab citizens of Israel
Arab-Israeli footballers
Footballers from Sakhnin
Israeli footballers
Bnei Sakhnin F.C. players
Maccabi Tel Aviv F.C. players
Maccabi Bnei Reineh F.C. players
Israeli Premier League players
Liga Leumit players
Israel youth international footballers
Israel under-21 international footballers
Israel international footballers
Association football forwards